Chassy may refer to the following places in France:

Chassy, Cher, a commune in the department of Cher
Chassy, Saône-et-Loire, a commune in the department of Saône-et-Loire
Chassy, Yonne, a commune in the department of Yonne